The Loening Duckling was an American flying boat built by Loening in the late 1910s.

Design and development
The Duckling was a single-bay biplane flying boat powered by a single Lawrence radial engine in tractor arrangement, and it featured a twin fin with its high-horizontal stabilizer. Although the aircraft was built in 1918, the limited information makes it unclear whether the aircraft flew or not.

Specifications
 Powerplant: one 60 hp Lawrence 3 cylinder radial engine

References 

Flying boats
Duckling
1910s United States experimental aircraft
Biplanes
Single-engined tractor aircraft